Luis Seoane (1910–1979) was a lithographer and artist.  Born in Buenos Aires, Argentina on June 1, 1910, of Galician immigrants, he spent much of his childhood and youth in Galicia (Spain).  He was educated in A Coruña. His first exhibition was held in 1929. He is usually included in the group of Os renovadores, the renovators of Galician art in the first third of the 20th century.

Returning to Argentina in 1936 to escape the Spanish Civil War, Seoane became an important cultural figure in Buenos Aires, where he was responsible for the creation of a number of murals and other public works of art.

On his return to Galicia in 1960, he became a leading figure within the movement to revive Galician culture. He died in A Coruña in 1979.

References

 "Seoane". Grial (Editorial Galaxia) (65). 1979. . Dieste, García-Sabell; Dónega; Carballo Calero; Díaz Pardo; Ledo; Piñeiro; Gómez Paz; Lorenzana; Paz-Andrade; Patiño; González Garcés; Seoane; García-Bodaño; Novoneyra; R. Ruibal; Blanco Amor; Fernández de la Vega; Cunqueiro; Losada; Tobío Fernández; Sucarrat Boutet; Fole; Girri and Odriozola.
 "Seoane López, Luís". Diccionario enciclopédico galego universal 55. La Voz de Galicia. 2003–2004. p. 72. .
 "Seoane López, Luís". Diciopedia do século 21 3. Do Cumio, Galaxia e do Castro. 2006. pp. 1915–1916. .
 "Seoane López, Luís". Enciclopedia Galega Universal 15. Ir Indo. 1999–2002. pp. 267–268. .
 "Seoane López, Luis". Gran Enciclopedia Galega Silverio Cañada (DVD). El Progreso. 2005. .
 "Luís Seoane". Raigame: revista de arte, cultura e tradicións populares (33). 2010. .
 Emigrante dun país soñado: Luís Seoane entre Galicia e Arxentina. CCG. 2011. . Villares; Sarlo; Sobrino; Díaz; Núñez Seixas; Devoto; Romero; Wechsler; Gutiérrez Viñualez; Axeitos; Castiñeiras; Portela; Casas; Méndez Ferrín; Beramendi; Patiño and Montero.
 Luís Seoane no Museo de Belas Artes da Coruña: O legado de Maruxa Seoane. Xunta de Galicia. 2019. .
 Alonso Montero, Xesús (2002) [1994]. As palabras do exilio. Biblioteca Galega 120 n.º 114. La Voz de Galicia. .
 Axeitos, X. L.; Seoane, X. (1994). Luís Seoane e o libro galego na Arxentina [1937-1978]. Deputación da Coruña.
 ——— (2004). A Academia no discurso exílico de Luís Seoane. Real Academia Galega. .
 ———; Díaz; Patiño; Pérez; Seoane; Villares (2010). Dicionario Seonae. Fundación Luis Seoane. .
 Barreiro; Longueira; López; Monterroso. Do primitivo na arte galega ata Luis Seoane. Fundación. .
 Barro, David; Montero, Carmela (2018). Luis Seoane. Deseño e diferenza. Santiago de Compostela: Dardo. .
 Braxe, L.; Seoane, X., eds. (1989). Galicia Emigrante (1954-1971). Escolma de textos da audición radial de Luis Seoane. Ediciós do Castro. .
 ———; ———, (1990). Figuraciós, de Luís Seoane. Deputación da Coruña. .
 ———; ———, (1994). O cine e a fotografía. Luís Seoane. Centro Galego de Artes da Imaxe. .
 ———; ——— (1996). Luís Seoane e o teatro. Sada: Ediciós do Castro. .
 ———; ——— (1996). Luís Seoane: textos sobre arte. Consello da Cultura Galega. .
 Capelán Rey, Antón (2010). Luís Seoane en Compostela e outros ensaios. Edicións Laiovento. .
 Castiñeiras, Manuel A. (1995). "Luis Seoane: a pintura como sinal de identidade" Anuario Brigantino (18): 295–300. .
 Cid; Neira; Seoane; Axeitos (1994). Luís Seoane, 1910-1979. Unha fotobiografía. Xerais. .
 Couceiro Freijomil, Antonio (1951-53). Diccionario bio-bibliográfico de escritores III. Bibliófilos Gallegos. p. 352.
 Cuba, Xulio (1994). Luís Seoane: A forma da patria. Didáctica. A Coruña: Espiral Maior. .
 Díaz Arias de Castro, Xosé (1994). Luís Seoane, a forxa da modernidade. Biblioteca Coruñesa. Vía Láctea. .
 ——— (2019). "Luis Seonae: unha vida e unha obra con Galicia ao fondo". Deputación da Coruña. Dep. legal: C 219–2019.
 ——— (2019). "Significado de Luis Seoane no contexto da cultura galega do século xx" Cadernos de Estudos Xerais (A. C. Irmáns Suárez Picallo) (16).
 Díaz Pampín, María América (2004). Luís Seoane. Notas ás súas cartas a Díaz Pardo 1957-1979. Ediciós do Castro. .
 Dónega, Marino (1994). Luis Seoane: vida e obra literaria. A Coruña: Real Academia Galega. .
 Fandiño, X. R.; López, Gloria, eds. (2010). Luís Seoane: teórico do deseño gráfico. Alicerces n.º 18. Museo do Pobo Galego. .
 Fernández Freixanes, Víctor (1976). Unha ducia de galegos. Vigo: Editorial Galaxia. pp. 61–78. .
 García, S. (2020). "El diseño gráfico y la identidad gallega desde el exilio…" Actas del III Simposio FHD Design Museum of Barcelona.
 González Fernández, Helena (1994). Luís Seoane. Vida e obra Agra Aberta. Editorial Galaxia. .
 López Bernárdez, C. (2005). Breve historia da arte galega - Breve historia del arte gallego. Nigratrea. .
 ——— (2015). Un pintor que sabía o que facía. Achegas á obra pictórica de Luís Seoane Edicións Laiovento. .
 ——— (2018). Identidade e universalidade. Lecturas de pintura galega Edicións Laiovento. .
 López Vázquez, J. M. (1990). Enciclopedia temática de Galicia. Arte 5. Barcelona: Nauta. pp. 225–227. .
 Lucie-Smith, Edward (1994). Arte latinoamericano del siglo XX. Barcelona: Ediciones Destino. .
 M. Vilanova, F. (1998). A pintura galega (1850-1950). Escola, Contextualización e Modernidade. Xerais. .
 Martínez-Romero, J. (2019). "Merecida homenaxe a un artista creador polifacético" Cadernos de Estudos Xerais (A. C. Irmáns Suárez Picallo) (14).
 Méndez Ferrín, Xosé Luis (1984). De Pondal a Novoneyra. Edicións Xerais de Galicia. pp. 100–102. .
 Pablos, Francisco (1981). Plástica Gallega. Caja de Ahorros Municipal de Vigo. pp. 300–301. .
 ——— (2003). A pintura en Galicia - La pintura en Galicia. Nigra Trea. pp. 138–141. .
 Pérez Rodríguez, Mª. Antonia (2003). Luis Seoane a través da prensa, 1929-1979. Sada: Ediciós do Castro. .
 Rey, G., ed. (2002). Luis Seoane ilustra a Rosalía. Centro de Estudios Rosalianos. Fundación Rosalía de Castro. .
 Seoane Rivas, Xavier (1994). A voz dun tempo. Luís Seoane: o criador total. Sada: Ediciós do Castro. .
 Squirru, Rafael (1976). Seoane (estudio crítico-biográfico). La Barca Gráfica. Buenos Aires: Dead Weight.
 Tilve, M. (2007). El despertar de la conciencia gallega en Buenos Aires: Luis Seoane y Galicia emigrante. Xeito Novo. .
 Varela Vázquez, Lorenzo (1948). Seoane. Buenos Aires: Botella al mar.
 Vázquez; García; Rosende; Ortega; Sobrino (1982). Historia del Arte Gallego. Madrid: Alhambra. .
 Vilavedra, Dolores, ed. (1995). Diccionario da literatura galega. Autores I. Vigo: Editorial Galaxia. pp. 557–560. .
 ———, ed. (2000). Diccionario da literatura galega. Obras III. Vigo: Editorial Galaxia. p. 205. .
 Villares, Ramón (2019). Galicia. Una nación entre dos mundos. Pasado & Presente. .

1910 births
1979 deaths
Artists from Buenos Aires
Writers from Galicia (Spain)
Argentine artists
Argentine people of Galician descent
Lithographers
20th-century Argentine artists 
20th-century lithographers